Seventh Rule Recordings is a record label based in Portland, Oregon that formed in 2003 to release underground metal and noise rock.  Founded by Scott and Cara Flaster, who still operate the label today, they have released albums by bands such as Akimbo, Buried at Sea, Indian, Author and Punisher and Sweet Cobra.

Bands that are/have been on Seventh Rule 
 Akimbo
 Atriarch
 Author and Punisher
 Batillus
 Buried At Sea
 Coffinworm
 Diesto
 Eight Bells
 Ephemeros
 Gnaw
 Graves at Sea
 Indian
 Light Yourself on Fire
 Lord Mantis
 Millions
 Plague Bringer
 Raise the Red Lantern
 Sheenjek
 Sweet Cobra
 The Makai
 Thoughts of Ionesco
 Wetnurse
 Wizard Rifle

See also
 List of record labels

External links
Official site
Chicago Reader Feature on Seventh Rule Recordings
Decibel Feature on Seventh Rule's Five Year Anniversary
Punknews interview with Scott and Cara Flaster

American record labels
Record labels established in 2003
Doom metal record labels
Heavy metal record labels